Mei Ami is a moshav in northern Israel. Located near Wadi Ara around two kilometres south of Umm al-Fahm with an area of 3,500 dunams, it falls under the jurisdiction of Menashe Regional Council.

History
The village was established in 1963 as a Nahal settlement, and was civilianised in 1969, becoming a kibbutz. In 1971 it was converted to a moshav shitufi and in 2006 to a moshav ovdim. It is named after Miami, Florida, as the Jewish community in the city helped with its establishment.

References

External links
Village website 

Moshavim
Nahal settlements
Former kibbutzim
Populated places established in 1963
Populated places in Haifa District
1963 establishments in Israel
American-Jewish culture in Israel